The 2016–17 Maritime Junior Hockey League season was the 50th season in league history. The season consisted of 50 games played by each MHL team.

At the end of the regular season, the league's top teams competed for the Kent Cup, the league's playoff championship trophy. The team successful in winning the Kent Cup went on to compete for the 2017 Fred Page Cup to determine the Eastern Canadian Champion, who would  then move on to compete for the 2017 Royal Bank Cup to determine the 2017 Junior 'A' champion.

Team Changes

No team changes.

Regular-season Standings 
Note: GP = Games played; W = Wins; L = Losses; OTL = Overtime losses; SL = Shootout losses; GF = Goals for; GA = Goals against; PTS = Points; STK = Streak; x = Clinched playoff spot y = Clinched division; z = Clinched first overall

2017 MHL Playoff bracket

Division Semi-final

 *= If Necessary

South Division Semi-final 1 (1) Pictou County Crushers vs. (4) Amherst Ramblers 
 Game 5 between Pictou County and Amherst was played at the Keating Millennium Centre in Antigonish on the campus of STFX

South Division Semi-final 2 (2) Truro Bearcats vs. (3) Yarmouth Mariners

North Division Semi-final 1 (1) Miramichi Timberwolves vs. (4) St Stephen Aces

North Division Semi-final 2 (2) Dieppe Commandos vs. (3) Summerside Western Capitals

Division finals

North Division (1) Miramichi Timberwolves vs. (3) Summerside Western Capitals

South Division Final (2) Truro Bearcats vs. (4) Amherst Ramblers

Final

MHL Final (2) Miramichi Timberwolves vs. (3) Truro Bearcats

External links 
 Official website of the Maritime Junior Hockey League
 Official website of the Canadian Junior Hockey League

MHL
Maritime Junior Hockey League seasons